ProQuest Dissertations and Theses (PQDT) is an online database that indexes, abstracts, and provides full-text access to dissertations and theses.  The database includes over 2.4 million records and covers 1637 to the present. It is produced by ProQuest and was formerly known as ProQuest Digital Dissertations. The bibliographic database (without full-text dissertations) is known as Dissertation Abstracts or Dissertation Abstracts International.

PQDT annually publishes more than 90% of all dissertations submitted from accredited institutions of higher learning in North America as well as from colleges and universities in Europe and Asia. Over the past 60 years, PQDT has amassed more than 1.4 million titles beginning with the first U.S. dissertation accepted by a university (Yale) in 1861. ProQuest began digitizing dissertations in  1997 from a microform archive.

In October 2015, ProQuest added the ability for authors to include an ORCID identifier when submitting a thesis.

Abstracts
Dissertation Abstracts, Dissertation Abstracts International (DAI) is a bibliographic database of American dissertations published since 1938, initially by University Microfilms International (UMI) now by ProQuest, Ann Arbor. 

DAI covers doctoral dissertations accepted at accredited American institutions since 1861. Selected master's theses have been included since 1962; since 1988, the database includes citations for dissertations from 50 British universities that are available at The British Document Supply Centre. Additionally, it covers a limited number of dissertations from the rest of the world.

The print version is published monthly and cumulated annually and it is available both in softcover and on microfiche. It is divided in three sections:
 Section A, Humanities and Social Sciences
 Section B, Sciences and Engineering
 Section C (DAI-C)(formerly European Dissertations) covers non-North American materials, most of them unavailable for purchase from ProQuest. As of 2008, ProQuest no longer offers DAI-C as a separate product.

The usability of dissertation abstracts depends largely on their content.  Many journals within the medical community have settled on a seven sentence structure, which is also gaining acceptance in the social sciences, education and business.  In it, the purpose of the study and methodological choices are outlined succinctly, allowing the reader or researcher to quickly scan and evaluate a number of studies to easily choose ones that meet their particular demands.  The structure contains variations on the following seven sentence stems: "The purpose of this study is...." "The scope of this study...." "The methodology...." "The Findings..." "Conclusions reached are ..." "Limitations of this study include...."  "This study contributes...."  Abstracts of dissertation proposals contain the same seven concepts, substituting data collection and analysis in place of findings and conclusions.  Abstracts are limited in the United States by the UMI to 350 words.

Former titles and print titles: From 1969: Dissertations Abstract International; from 1951: Dissertations Abstracts;  from  Microfilm Abstracts (an annual catalog of the dissertations available for sale from UMI), American Doctoral Dissertations (ADD), (until 1964): Index to American Doctoral Dissertations, (until 1956): Doctoral Dissertations Accepted by American Universities. Masters Abstracts International (MAI).

There are different versions in print and online. The online version is Dissertation Abstracts Online while the print bibliography is termed Dissertation Abstracts International. Material except the abstracts themselves were issued also on CD-ROM under the title: Dissertation abstracts ondisc.

 1997: Dissertations go digital with ProQuest Digital Dissertations
 1998: Library of Congress recognizes UMI as offsite repository of Digital Dissertations Library

See also
 Gray literature
 Indexing and abstracting service

References

Further reading 
 Davinson, D. (1977). Theses and Dissertations as Information Sources. London: Clive Bingley.
 Glatthorn, A. A. & Joyner, R. L. (2005). Writing the Winning Thesis or Dissertation: A Step by Step Guide. Thousand Oaks: Corwin Press.

External links 
 

Bibliographic databases and indexes
Full-text scholarly online databases
ProQuest
Theses